Nguendula Filipe (born May 20, 1982) is an Angolan women's basketball player. At the 2012 Summer Olympics, she competed for the Angola women's national basketball team in the women's event. She is 5 ft 10 inches tall.

References

External links
 

1982 births
Living people
Angolan women's basketball players
Basketball players at the 2012 Summer Olympics
Olympic basketball players of Angola
Basketball players from Luanda
G.D. Interclube women's basketball players
Small forwards
African Games silver medalists for Angola
African Games medalists in basketball
Competitors at the 2011 All-Africa Games